Richard Rösler (25 August 1881 – 1 June 1969) was a German swimmer. He competed in the men's 200 metre breaststroke event at the 1908 Summer Olympics.

References

1881 births
1969 deaths
German male swimmers
Olympic swimmers of Germany
Swimmers at the 1908 Summer Olympics
Sportspeople from Wrocław